Cormeilles may refer to the following communes in France:
 Cormeilles, Eure, in the Eure département
 Cormeilles, Oise, in the Oise département
 Cormeilles-en-Parisis, in the Val-d'Oise département
 Cormeilles-en-Vexin, in the Val-d'Oise département